Paulo Nazareth (b. 1977) is a Brazilian contemporary artist based in Belo Horizonte, Brazil.

Biography 
Paulo Nazareth was born in 1977, Governador Valadares, Minas Gerais, Brazil, and is of Afro-Brazilian descent. Nazareth builds relationships with the diverse individuals he meets while traveling for his artoften long distances by footand these people often become the inspiration for his works of art. In March 2011, he walked from Minas Gerais, Brazil to New York in the United States. This solo journey took him 5 months as he traveled by foot thousands of miles north, never washing his bare feet, refraining only until he was able to ritualistically wash them in eastern New York's Hudson River. The trip served as a form of performance, as he gauged the reactions of the people he interacted with as he passed through their towns and cities, receiving their feelings about himself, specifically his racial identity and appearance.

Education 
Paulo Nazareth earned his BFA in 2005, and his MFA in 2006, both from the Universidade Federal de Minas Gerais in Brazil. In 2010, he returned to the university to study Linguistics.  He also studied under Mestre Orlando, who is originally from Bahia, Belo Horizonte.

Artworks 
Paulo Nazareth's ethnic heritage and cultural background are major aspects in his works. Through his art, he intends to bring awareness to global issues such as globalization, immigration, ethnicization, and the effects of capitalism in his home country of Brazil, and Latin America as a whole. He primarily works in performance art, painting, and installation.

One of the artist's most notable performance pieces is perhaps his 2011 work titled Banana Market, also known as Art Market, in which he initially attempted to carry a sack of bananas with him on foot from Latin America to an exhibition Art Basel in Miami, but the work was thwarted when there would be complications with bringing fruit across international borders. Paulo then decided to display one ton of bananas (along with photos, drawings, and placards) in a Volkswagen bus at the exhibition in lieu of the performance.

Awards and grants 
As a part of his PIPA Prize awards in 2016, of which he won the two main categories (PIPA and Popular Vote Exhibition) Paulo Nazareth made another journey on foot from Belo Horizonte to New York to receive his award, then stayed in the state for the next three months for a residency at Residency Unlimited as part of his PIPA Prize award.

2016 PIPA Prize, PIPA Institute,  Museum of Modern Art of Rio de Janeiro, Rio de Janeiro, Brazil
2012 MASP de Artes Visuais – Mercedes-Benz Award, São Paulo, Brazil
2010 12º Salão Nacional de Arte de Itajaí, Santa Catarina, Brazil

Exhibitions 
Paulo Nazareth's most recent solo and group exhibitions are Paulo Nazareth, Melee, ICA Miami, Miami (2019) and Lingua Solta, Museu da lingua Portuguesa, São Paulo, Brazil (2021).

References 

1977 births
Living people
Brazilian contemporary artists
People from Belo Horizonte